David Cordley Bradford (1922–2002), was a British general practitioner who founded the first purpose built surgery in Gloucestershire. In 1945, he was one of the volunteer London medical students from St Bartholomew's Hospital sent to assist at Belsen following its liberation by British troops.

See also
List of London medical students who assisted at Belsen

References

External links 
Bradford, David Cordley (oral history)

1922 births
2002 deaths
20th-century British medical doctors
London medical students who assisted at Belsen
1945 in medicine